The Elephant Hotel is an historic building in Somers, Westchester County, New York. 

Elephant hotel may also refer to:

 Elephantine Colossus, Coney Island, Brooklyn, New York
 Lucy the Elephant, Margate City, near Atlantic City, New Jersey